In algebraic topology, a branch of mathematics, a connective spectrum is a spectrum whose homotopy sets  of negative degrees are zero.

References

External links 

Why are connective spectra called “connective”?

Algebraic topology
Homotopy theory